Mayron De Almeida (born 22 November 1995) is a Belgian professional footballer who plays for Luxembourgisch club Progrès Niederkorn as a forward.

Career
De Almeida came through the youth ranks of Belgian club R.E. Virton. After 11 years at the clubs he left the club and signed for French Ligue 2 side FC Tours. He made his Ligue 2 debut for Tours against Gazélec Ajaccio on 30 September 2016. 

In December 2017, De Almeida joined Luxembourgish club Progrès Niederkorn on a two-and-a-half-year contract.

On 1 July 2020, De Almeida signed a two-year deal with Red Star F.C. in the French Championnat National.

Personal life
De Almeida is of Portuguese descent.

Career statistics

References

External links
 
 

1995 births
Living people
Belgian footballers
Belgian people of Portuguese descent
Association football forwards
R.E. Virton players
Tours FC players
FC Progrès Niederkorn players
Red Star F.C. players
Challenger Pro League players
Ligue 2 players
Championnat National players
Luxembourg National Division players
Belgian expatriate footballers
Expatriate footballers in France
Belgian expatriate sportspeople in France
Expatriate footballers in Luxembourg
Belgian expatriate sportspeople in Luxembourg